The Bantu Labour Relations Regulations Amendment Act was an Act of the South African Parliament in 1973.

It permitted some industrial activity within a restrictive framework of liaison committees and works committees.  Liaison committees were consultative.  They were half management representatives and half selected from the workers.  Works committees were made up exclusively of workers and their job was to convey workers demands to the employers.  However they had no power to represent individual workers.  There was no legal framework for reaching agreements.

It also empowered the Minister to issue a Wages Order setting wages at the employer's request.

2503 liaison committees were established by 1977 - eight times more than works committees.

References

1973 in South African law